The Avar Treasure, called sometimes Vrap Treasure, is an ensemble currently in the collection of the Metropolitan Museum of Art. The various vessel making up the ensemble were found in Vrap, Albania, and have been attributed to the Avars. On the other hand, the treasure is attributed also to the Bulgars.

The Avars were a nomadic people from the steppes of Eurasia who arrived in the Balkans in the 6th century AD. Being a warlike people, the Avars warred with and subjugated much of the local population, and occasionally clashed with the Byzantine Empire. Through these conquests, the Avars were able to amass considerable amounts of treasure, some of which was buried en masse near Avar settlements. The origin of the treasures found is disputed; some posit that the Avars were themselves skilled metalworkers, while others believe that the valuable objects (including gold jars, cups, and dishes) found in Avar hoards were made in Byzantium and then either looted or given as tribute to the Avars.

The ensemble housed at the Metropolitan Museum of Art was recovered from the Albanian village of Vrap (which rose to international prominence in 1902 when a cache of Avar gold and silver was found in the village) in the early 20th century and given to the museum by J. P. Morgan Jr. in 1917. The ensemble consists of several gold cups, a silver bucket, several drinking dishes and a jug.

See also 
 Pereshchepina Treasure
 Treasure of Nagyszentmiklós
 Preslav Treasure

References

Further reading 
 

Metalwork of the Metropolitan Museum of Art
Avar people
Bulgars
Albania–United States relations